Rickreall Creek is a stream in Polk County, Oregon, United States rising on Laurel Mountain in the Central Oregon Coast Range and draining into the Willamette River west of Salem at Eola. The creek passes through the city of Dallas and the unincorporated community of Rickreall. The origin of the name is under some dispute, but one theory says that "Rickreall" is a corruption of "La Creole", La Creole River being another name for the stream.

See also
Ellendale, Oregon
Multnomah (sidewheeler 1851)
Pomona (sternwheeler)
Pumping Station Bridge
Washington (steamboat 1851)

References

External links

Rickreall Watershed Assessment, 2001
Coordinates:
 Source
 Mouth

Tributaries of the Willamette River
Rivers of Oregon
Rivers of Polk County, Oregon
Dallas, Oregon